Ramón Trebaylla was a Bishop of Urgell who served as Episcopal Co-Prince of Andorra from 1309 to 1326. He served alongside French Co-Princes Gaston I (1309–1315) and Gaston II of Foix - Bearne (1315–1326).

References

14th-century Princes of Andorra
Bishops of Urgell
Year of birth missing
Year of death missing
14th-century Roman Catholic bishops in Castile